The 2020 Atlantic 10 men's basketball tournament was the postseason men's basketball tournament for the Atlantic 10 Conference's 2019–20 season. It was scheduled to be held from March 11, through March 15, 2020, at the Barclays Center in Brooklyn, New York.

On March 12, 2020, the remainder of the Atlantic 10 Tournament was cancelled due to the COVID-19 pandemic.

Seeds
All 14 A-10 schools were slated to participate in the tournament. Teams were seeded by record within the conference, with a tiebreaker system to seed teams with identical conference records. The top 10 teams received a first-round bye and the top four teams received a double bye, automatically advancing them to the quarterfinals.

Schedule

*Game times in Eastern Time.

Bracket

* denotes overtime period

Game summaries

First round

References

Tournament
Atlantic 10 men's basketball tournament
Atlantic 10 men's basketball tournament
College sports in New York City
Sports in Brooklyn
Basketball competitions in New York City
Atlantic 10 men's basketball tournament
Atlantic 10 men's basketball tournament
2020s in Brooklyn
Prospect Heights, Brooklyn